Abu Rizal Maulana (born 27 August 1994) is an Indonesian professional footballer who plays as a right-back or defensive midfielder for Liga 1 club Persita Tangerang.

Career statistics

Club

Honours

Club 
Persebaya Surabaya
 Liga 2: 2017
 East Java Governor Cup: 2020

References

External links
 Abu Rizal Maulana at Soccerway
 Abu Rizal Maulana at Liga Indonesia

1994 births
Living people
Indonesian footballers
People from Sampang Regency
Sportspeople from East Java
Persebaya Surabaya players
Sriwijaya F.C. players
Persiba Balikpapan players
PSM Makassar players
Persita Tangerang players
Liga 2 (Indonesia) players
Liga 1 (Indonesia) players
Association football defenders